The Jolla smartphone (or Jolla 1 or J1) is a smartphone produced by Jolla that runs the Sailfish OS. Following a successful crowdfunding campaign, it was manufactured in China and released on 27th November 2013. The Jolla smartphone is no longer supported by Sailfish OS updates, the last update compatible being v3.4.0, released on 22 September 2020.

Like the Nokia N9, the Jolla diverted from the at that time conventional smartphone home button centric user interface and only featured a power button and a volume up and down rocker switch. Instead it relied on a swipe interface to close and switch between screens and applications would access a pulley menu to select menu items inside applications.

In addition to the comparably limited number of native Sailfish applications available in the Jolla app store, the Jolla Phone featured the proprietary Alien Dalvik to provide support for and installing Android-applications from Aptoide.

First unveiled device 

On 20 May 2013, after IamTheOtherHalf internet campaign, Jolla unveiled the following details and design of their first device:
 4.5 in IPS qHD (540×960) "Estrade" display
 Qualcomm Snapdragon 400 1.4 GHz dual-core
 16 GB of storage memory
 microSD support
 8 MPix AF camera, back
 2 MPix camera, front
 2100 mAh user-replaceable battery 
 "The Other Half"
 Gesture-based Sailfish OS
 Android applications compliant
 MicroUSB
 3.5 mm headphone jack
 Buttonless display, gesture navigation
 Device in English language version
 Qt, QML, HTML5 (see: Sailfish OS architecture)

The Sailfish OS SDK was published at the end of February 2013.

The Jolla smartphone is compatible with frequency bands in the ITU region 1: 4G (LTE) bands 3 (1800 MHz), 7 (2600 MHz) and 20 (800 MHz); 3G (WCDMA / UMTS) band 1 (2100 MHz), 8 (900 MHz); 2G (GSM) bands 850 Mhz, 900 Mhz, 1800 Mhz, 1900 Mhz. 4G and 3G will work in regions like Europe but support is not guaranteed in regions like America, even if a compatible frequency band is used.

Retail availability
Jolla started shipping the phone in late November 2013. At first the phone could only be ordered on the web from within the European Union.  (It is not available in the US via the website or any other outlet.)

The phone also became available in the stores of the Finnish carrier DNA on 11 December 2013.

On 28 April 2014, the Jolla phone became available in Estonia at the outlets of Elisa Eesti, the first operator outside Finland to offer the phone in their shops.

On 25 July 2014 Jolla opened the first Jolla store in Kazakhstan in association with Mobile Invest.

On 12 August 2014 Jolla was launched in Hong Kong in a partnership with 3 Hong Kong.

In September 2014, Jolla launched in India on e-retailer Snapdeal.

In November 2014, Jolla launched in Russia.

Support
Sailfish OS updates were provided for the Jolla 1 for 7 years.

Other Linux distributions like postmarketOS continue to provide updates for the original Jolla phone but don't support calls, SMS or mobile data.

See also
Sailfish OS
Jolla

References

Footnotes

External links

 
 Engadget review on 2013-11-29 A closer look at the Jolla phone: good intentions, bad delivery
 TechRadar hands on review on 2014-02-25 Hands on: Jolla Phone review
 Jolla Phone data and reviews on GSMArena
 Slashgear on 2018-11-01: Jolla Sailfish OS 3 launches on barely any new phones

MeeGo devices
Smartphones
Linux-based devices
Open-source mobile phones
Videotelephony